The Waltz in C minor is a piano waltz composed by Frédéric Chopin in 1847, the second work of his opus 64 and the companion to the "Minute Waltz" (Op. 64, No. 1).  Chopin dedicated this Waltz to Madame Nathaniel de Rothschild. 

It consists of three main themes:
 Theme A tempo giusto chordal with a walking pace feel;
 Theme B più mosso (faster) — theme stated in running eighth notes, with all harmony in the left hand.
 Theme C più lento (slower) — a sostenuto in the parallel key of C minor (D major, enharmonic equivalent to C major). Besides the slower general pace, the melody is in quarter notes except for a few flourishes in eighth notes, giving this section the quality of an interlude before the dramatic restatement of Theme B.

The overall layout of the piece is A B C B A B. In an orchestrated version, it forms part of the ballet Les Sylphides.

References

External links 
 
 Hear a performance of the piece at The Chopin Project site

Waltzes by Frédéric Chopin
1847 compositions
Compositions in C-sharp minor
Music with dedications